Daniel Aaron Lissing (born 4 October 1981) is an Australian actor. He played Conrad De Groot in Crownies in 2011. The following year, he appeared in American military drama Last Resort. From January 2014 to April 2018, Lissing starred as Jack Thornton in When Calls the Heart.

Career 
In 2006, he appeared as a guest in the successful Australian series Home and Away where he played the firefighter Dave Elder.

In 2011, he joined the cast of the series Crownies where he played Conrad De Groot, the fiancé of the lawyer Tatum Novak (Indiana Evans), until the end of the series the same year. The same year he appeared in the movie Entwined where he played Aiden.

In 2012, it was announced that he would join the cast of the American series Last Resort as James King, a petty officer of the U.S. Navy, and a Navy SEAL. In the series he appeared with Andre Braugher, Scott Speedman, Autumn Reeser and Daisy Betts.

That same year he joined the cast of the movie The Cure where he played the role of Ryan Earl, a member of a research team that he feels he deserves greater recognition and fame.

In September 2014, he joined the was cast of MTV's thriller series Eye Candy. He played the main role of Ben Miller, a detective, who worked with and falls in love with Lindy (Victoria Justice). The series is about a genius (Justice) who realizes that her online suitor is a dangerous cyber stalker.  His character was killed off after two episodes.

From 2014 to 2018, Lissing appeared in the Hallmark Channel series When Calls the Heart as Canadian Mountie Jack Thornton. He chose to leave the role at the end of Season 5 and his character was killed off.

In 2016, Lissing appeared alongside Jessica Lowndes in Hallmark Channel's A December Bride as the character Seth. In 2018, he and Brooke D'Orsay starred in the channel's film Christmas in Love.

Lissing reprised his role as Jack Thornton for a cameo appearance in When Hope Calls: A Country Christmas in late 2021.

Personal life
Lissing is Jewish. He married his partner Nadia in early 2020.

Filmography

Film

Television

References

External links 
 

Living people
Male actors from Sydney
1981 births
Australian male television actors
Australian male film actors
21st-century Australian male actors